Radio G.R.E.M. is an Italian television series.

See also
List of Italian television series

References

Italian television series